Tumarkin, Tomarkin  or Toumarkin may refer to:

People
Anna Tumarkin (born 1875), Swiss philosopher
Leander Tomarkin (born 1865), Swiss impostor
lev Tumarkin, (1901-1974) Russian mathematician
Maurice Tumarkin, (1900-1972, American fashion designer
Peter Tomarken (born 1942), American game show host
Yakov-Yan Toumarkin (born 1992), Israeli swimmer
Yigal Tumarkin (born 1933), Israeli painter
Yon Tumarkin (born 1989), Israeli actor

Other uses 
Tumarkin drop attack, a sudden fall without loss of consciousness